Community is a tribute album dedicated to the work of Ian Curtis, Gillian Gilbert, Peter Hook, Stephen Morris and Bernard Sumner of the bands New Order and Joy Division that was released in 2004.

The Project

The Community project started when Alejo Parella submitted his own covers of New Order and Electronic and it caught the eyes of producer Michael Nguyen. It ended up in a big contest opened to artists from all over the world. More than 60 covers were submitted, and people from all over the world were allowed to vote to pick their favorite 15 tracks.

The final track listing is the songs that got the most votes, an unusual approach.

All artists were limited to 3 covers, a first round of voting was to determine which one of their cover would make it to the final round. In case the song was submitted by two or more artists, there were elimination rounds to pick the winner of those songs, but then the eliminated artist's second most popular song moved to the final round.

The final round saw about 40 songs, done by pure fans of New Order because it was done via New Order's semi-official website.

Track listing
 kREMLIN - "Sooner Than You Think"  – 3:47 - UK
 Captain Black - "Procession"  – 4:28 - UK
 Evaluna - Thieves Like Us  – 3:51 - USA
 Labster - "Face Up"  – 4:58 - Greece
 Project Wintermute - "Transmission"  – 3:55 - Australia
 Unfaith - "True Faith"  – 4:10 - Canada
 Cloudless - "Some Distant Memory"  – 4:59 - USA
 Slightly Narrow Sound System - "Heart and Soul"  – 3:10 - UK
 C Bentley - "In a Lonely Place"  – 4:21 - USA
 Dance Upon Nothing - "Bizarre Love Triangle"  – 4:28 - USA
 International - "The Perfect Kiss"  – 4:20 - Brazil
 Flight - "Dreams Never End"  – 3:40 - UK
 Spiral of Silence - "Dead Souls"  – 3:44 - Belgium
 La Fin De Tout - "586"  – 4:52 - France
 The Minus One - "We All Stand"  – 4:44 - Greece
 almanso - "Angel Dust"  – 4:11 - Argentina
 Digital (aka Known Pleasures) - "Love Vigilantes" (Hidden Track)  – 4:31 - UK

CommunityEP

Due to the high quality of the songs submitted, the producers of the album decided to release CommunityEP, a selection of their favorite songs that were not included on the album. The reason you might see similar artists is because they did submit more than one cover in the competition, but they were so good that the producers decided to release them anyway.

One track is part is also the winner of a remix competition that was held where the members had to vote between 10+ remixes done by several artists.

Track listing
 almanso - Ceremony  – 4:07 - Argentina
 The Minus One - Dreams Never End  – 3:17 - Greece
 Manumatic - Love Less  – 3:09 - USA
 C Bentley - Temptation  – 5:19 - USA
 almanso - Angel Dust (Project Wintermute Evil Dust Machine Remix)  – 5:18 - Argentina
 Digital - Leave Me Alone  – 5:00 - UK
 Nemesis - Crystal  – 4:37 - Argentina/Greece

Follow Up

In 2005, NewOrderOnline.com announced the project of Community 2, One year later, on October 31, 2006, Community 2: A NewOrderOnline Tribute has been released.

References 

New Order (band) tribute albums
2004 EPs
2004 albums